Mubende is a district in the Central Region of Uganda. The town of Mubende is the site of the district headquarters. The district was reduced in size in July 2005 with the creation of the Mityana District and reduced again in 2019 with the creation of Kassanda District.

Location
Mubende District is bordered by Kyankwanzi District to the north, Kiboga District and Kassanda to the northeast and Mityana District to the east. Gomba District and Sembabule District lie to the south, Kyegegwa District to the southwest and Kibaale District to the northwest of Mubende District. The coordinates of Mubende District are:00 36N, 31 24E.

Overview
It comprises three counties, namely Buwekula, Kassanda and Kasambya. The district has eighteen sub-counties and one town council which include: Kassanda is no longer among its counties. It has been confirmed to be an independent district.

Population
The 1991 population census estimated the district population at about 277,500. In 2002 the national census estimated the population of the district to be about 423,450 people of whom (50.3%) were males and (49.7%) were female, with an annual population growth rate of 3.6%. It is estimated that in 2012, the population of the district was about 610,600.

Economic activity
The major economic activity in Mubende District is agriculture with emphasis on food crops like:

Cash crops grown in the district include:
 Coffee
 Tea

See also
Mubende
Central Region, Uganda
Buganda
Districts of Uganda

References

External links
Profile of Mubende District

 
Districts of Uganda
Central Region, Uganda